Timur Maratovich Koblov (born 25 January 1997) is a Russian football player.

Club career
He made his debut in the Russian Professional Football League for FC Lada-Togliatti on 3 August 2017 in a game against FC Orenburg-2.

References

External links
 Profile by Russian Professional Football League

1997 births
Sportspeople from Vladikavkaz
Living people
Russian footballers
Association football midfielders
Russia youth international footballers
FC Rubin Kazan players
FC Lada-Tolyatti players
FC Milsami Orhei players
Russian Second League players
Moldovan Super Liga players
Kyrgyz Premier League players
Russian expatriate footballers
Expatriate footballers in Moldova
Russian expatriate sportspeople in Moldova
Expatriate footballers in Kyrgyzstan
Russian expatriate sportspeople in Kyrgyzstan